Gervane Zjandric Adonnis Kastaneer (born 9 June 1996) is a professional footballer who plays for Eerste Divisie club PEC Zwolle. Born in the Netherlands, he has represented the Curaçao national team internationally.

Club career
Kastaneer played for Eerste Divisie club FC Dordrecht during the 2012–2013 football season. From 2013 till 2017 he was contracted to ADO Den Haag while being loaned out to FC Eindhoven in 2016.

In July 2017, Kastaneer joined 2. Bundesliga side 1. FC Kaiserslautern signing a three-year contract.

In June 2018, after being released by Kaiserslautern, Kastaneer returned to the Eredivisie signing a two-year contract with NAC Breda.

Coventry City
In June 2019, Kastaneer signed a three-year deal with English Championship side Coventry City for an undisclosed fee. On 1 February 2020, Kastaneer joined Scottish Championship side Heart of Midlothian on loan until the end of the 2020–21 season. On 6 July 2021, it was announced that Kastaneer's contract with the club had been terminated by mutual consent, leaving the club having made 18 appearances in all competitions and having scored one goal.

PEC Zwolle
In July 2021, Kastaneer signed a two-year deal with Dutch Eredivisie side PEC Zwolle, with an option for another year. He made his debut on 15 August in a 1–0 home loss to Vitesse, starting as a right winger before coming off for Chardi Landu in the 65th minute.

International career
Kastaneer was born in the Netherlands and is of Curaçaoan descent. Originally a youth international for the Netherlands, he switched and debuted for the Curaçao national team in a 5–0 CONCACAF Nations League win over the US Virgin Islands on 12 October 2018.

Career statistics

Club

International
Scores and results list Curaçao's goal tally first, score column indicates score after each Kastaneer goal.

Honours
Coventry City
 EFL League One: 2019–20

Heart of Midlothian
 Scottish Championship: 2020–21

Curaçao
 King's Cup: 2019

References

External links
 
 

Living people
1996 births
Association football wingers
Association football forwards
Footballers from Rotterdam
Curaçao footballers
Curaçao international footballers
Dutch footballers
Netherlands youth international footballers
Netherlands under-21 international footballers
Dutch people of Curaçao descent
SC Feyenoord players
FC Dordrecht players
ADO Den Haag players
FC Eindhoven players
1. FC Kaiserslautern players
NAC Breda players
Coventry City F.C. players
Heart of Midlothian F.C. players
PEC Zwolle players
Eredivisie players
Eerste Divisie players
2. Bundesliga players
English Football League players
Scottish Professional Football League players
Dutch expatriate footballers
Curaçao expatriate footballers
Dutch expatriate sportspeople in Germany
Dutch expatriate sportspeople in England
Dutch expatriate sportspeople in Scotland
Expatriate footballers in Germany
Expatriate footballers in England
Expatriate footballers in Scotland